The British Independent Film Award for Breakthrough Producer is an annual award given by the British Independent Film Awards (BIFA) to recognize the best British breakthrough producer. The award was first presented in the 2016 ceremony.

According to BIFA, the category is for a "British producer for their first or second documentary or fiction feature film".

Winners and nominees

2010s

2020s

See also
 BAFTA Award for Outstanding Debut by a British Writer, Director or Producer

References

External links
 Official website

British Independent Film Awards